Peter or Pete Walker may refer to:

Politics 
 Peter Walker (Australian politician) (1922–1987)
 Peter Walker, Baron Walker of Worcester (1932–2010), British politician
 Peter Walker (RAF officer) (1949–2015), Lieutenant Governor of Guernsey

Sports 
 Peter Walker (cricketer, born 1936) (1936–2020), English cricketer and broadcaster
 Peter Walker (cricketer, born 1952), English cricketer for Devon
 Peter Walker (footballer) (1942–2010), Australian rules footballer
 Peter Walker (golfer), Scottish golfer
 Peter Walker (racing driver) (1912–1984), British racing driver
 Pete Walker (baseball) (born 1969), baseball player for the Toronto Blue Jays

Other 
 Peter Walker (actor) (born 1927), American film, stage and television actor
 Peter Walker (brewer) (died 1879), Scottish brewer
 Peter Walker (bishop) (1919–2010), Anglican bishop
 Peter Walker (guitarist) (born 1937), American folk guitarist
 Peter Walker (dancer), American ballet dancer
 Peter Walker (landscape architect), American
 Pete Walker (director) (born 1939), British film director
 Peter J. Walker (1916–2003), British musician and audio engineer, founder of Quad Electroacoustics